Aimé Vincent Perpillou (24 January 1902 – 12 February 1976) was a French geographer.

Early years

Aimé Vincent Perpillou was born in Glanges, Haute-Vienne, on 24 January 1902.
He was from an old Limousin family.
His parents were André Perpillou, a soldier, and Marie Bancaud.
For his secondary education he first attended the Lycée Gay-Lussac in Limoges, then after his father had been posted to western France he attended the Lycée Henri IV in Poitiers.
In 1923 he passed the entrance exam and was admitted to the École Normale Supérieure (ENS) in the rue d'Ulm, Paris.
While at this school he also attended classes taught by Lucien Gallois and Albert Demangeon at the Institut de Géographie of the Sorbonne (University of Paris).
His classmates included Jean-Paul Sartre and the geographer Jean Dresch.
He undertook research into climatology, earning a diplôme d'études supérieures for this work.

While studying in Paris Perpillou met Suzanne Demangeon, daughter of the professor of social geography Albert Demangeon. 
They later married and had a son and three daughters.
In 1927 he came first in France in the agrégation exam in history and geography.
He undertook a year of military services, then accepted a teaching position at his former school, the Lycés Gay-Lussac in Limoges.

Academic career

Perpillou soon moved from Limoges to teach maritime geography in Brest at the École Navale and the École des élèves ingénieurs mécaniciens de la Marine.
He remained in Brest until 1939.
During his time in Brest in the 1930s he published several articles on the coastline and sea bed around the west of Brittany,.
He also examined terrain and changes in land use in the Limousin area, the basis for his doctorat d'état in 1940.
Perpillou, based on careful study of land use in Limousin, stated that before the eradication of the heath at the end of the nineteenth century, for eight centuries the agricultural landscape in Limousin had undergone only minor modifications.

In 1960 Perpillou moved to the Lycée Henri-IV in Paris.
During World War II (1939–45) he was active with the Société de géographie of Paris.
In 1945 Perpillou became a lecturer at the Faculty of Letters of the University of Lille.
His assistant in Lille was Philippe Pinchemel, who would follow Perpillou when he moved back to the Sorbonne and would lecture on economic geography at the Institut d'Études Politiques de Paris from 1948 to 1953.
In 1947 Perpillou was appointed secretary-general of the Société de géographie, and held this position for the next 25 years.
In 1948 he accepted the chair of economic geography at the Institut de géographie of the Sorbonne, and was given the same office that had been used by his father-in-law.
He taught there for the rest of his academic career.
Perpillou also taught at the ENS at Saint Cloud from 1944 to 1955, and at the ENS rue d'Ulm from 1948 to 1952.
He was elected to the Académie de Marine in 1958.

Perpillou retired from the Sorbonne in 1972 and accepted the position of President of the Société de géographie.
He died in Paris on 12 February 1976.

Publications

Perpillou influenced Marc Bloch with his treatment of climate, in which he did not rely on averages but argued that "It is not 'le temps qu'il fait' [the weather], in its often brutal integrality and reality, from which above all man suffers the repercussions." 
At first Perpillou was mainly interested in physical geography, but most of his publications concerned human geography, particularly economic geography.
He was very interested in the study of marine geography and history.
Perpillou extended his work in Limousin to cover the whole of France in a series of colored national and regional maps that display land use in the early 19th century, early 20th century and post-war period.

Perpillou's publications include:

Notes

Sources

1902 births
1976 deaths
Academic staff of Paris-Sorbonne University
French geographers
People from Haute-Vienne
20th-century geographers